Senegalia moggii is a species of  plant in the family Fabaceae. It is found only in Somalia, and is threatened by habitat loss.

References

moggii
Near threatened plants
Endemic flora of Somalia
Taxonomy articles created by Polbot